Andrew Ready (born 11 July 1993) is a rugby union player for the Western Force team in the Super Rugby competition, playing as a hooker.

Early life
Ready was born in Brisbane, and attended St Joseph's College, Gregory Terrace. He was selected for the Australian Schoolboys rugby team in 2010.

Career
Ready played premier rugby for Easts Tigers and was a member of the club's premiership winning team in 2013. He was selected for the Australia U20 team in 2013.

In 2014, Ready played for Brisbane City in the inaugural National Rugby Championship.

Ready was selected on the bench for the Reds' match against the Highlanders in 2014, but wasn't used as a replacement player in the game. He made his Super Rugby debut against the Hurricanes in April 2015.

References

External links
Reds profile
itsrugby.co.uk profile

1993 births
Australian rugby union players
Queensland Reds players
Brisbane City (rugby union) players
Rugby union hookers
Living people
Rugby union players from Brisbane
Barbarian F.C. players
Southland rugby union players
Western Force players
US Colomiers players